Live Nude Girls is a 1995 American comedy film featuring Dana Delany, Kim Cattrall, Cynthia Stevenson, Laila Robins, Lora Zane and Olivia d'Abo. The film writer and director Julianna Lavin (in her directing debut) plays the role of a minor character.

Synopsis
A group of childhood friends have a sleepover as a bachelorette party for Jamie, where the conversations evolve from the topic of their relationships with men to sex and related fantasies. The group includes two sisters, Rachel and Jill, between whom remains some emotional tension. The hostess for the evening, the bisexual Georgina, is pestered by her possessive live-in lover Chris, who declines to join the party, staying in her bedroom.

Cast
 Dana Delany as Jill
 Kim Cattrall as Jamie
 Cynthia Stevenson as Marcy
 Laila Robins as Rachel
 Lora Zane as Georgina
 Olivia d'Abo as Chris
 Glenn Quinn as Randy
 Tim Choate as Jerome
 Jeremy Jordan as Jeffery, Greenpeace boy
 Vaginal Davis as the pool man
 Simon Templeman as Bob
 Julianna Lavin as the fighting neighbor woman
 Jerry Spicer as the fighting neighbor man
 Joshua Beckett as Richard Silver
 Brian Markinson as Jerome's friend

Reception
On review aggregator website Rotten Tomatoes, the film holds an approval rating of 38% based on 8 reviews. The film received mostly negative reviews from critics, but performances praised by some critics. Live Nude Girls received limited release grossing $23,808.

References

External links
 
 
 
 

1995 films
1995 comedy-drama films
1995 directorial debut films
1995 independent films
1995 LGBT-related films
1990s American films
1990s English-language films
American comedy-drama films
American independent films
American LGBT-related films
Films scored by Anton Sanko
I.R.S. Media films
Lesbian-related films
LGBT-related comedy-drama films
Republic Pictures films